Gongguan (formerly transliterated as Kungkuan Station until 2003) is a metro station in Taipei, Taiwan served by the Taipei Metro. National Taiwan University, the most prestigious university of Taiwan, is close to the station.

Station overview

The two-level, underground station has an island platform and four exits. The washrooms are outside the entrance area.

History
Originally, two separate stations were planned: one to serve National Taiwan University and the other (to be named Gongguan station) at the junction of Roosevelt Road and Keelung Road. The two stations were later combined as one and moved to the present position where it began operation on 11 November 1999.

Another accessible elevator is opened at exit 2 to serve the National Taiwan University community. It was completed after a year of construction on 16 June 2010.

Station layout

Around the station
 Museum of Zoology
 Taipei Water Park
 National Taiwan University
 Museum of Drinking Water
 Treasure Hill
 Gongguan Night Market

See also
 Gongguan, Taipei

References

Songshan–Xindian line stations
Railway stations opened in 1999
1999 establishments in Taiwan